Frederick William Blackwell (September 7, 1891 – December 8, 1975) was a Major League Baseball catcher who played for the Pittsburgh Pirates from  to .

External links

1891 births
1975 deaths
Major League Baseball catchers
Pittsburgh Pirates players
Baseball players from Kentucky
Lexington Colts players
Wheeling Stogies players
Newark Bears (IL) players
Kansas City Blues (baseball) players